The 18 former counties of Tasmania, renamed as Land Districts:
Arthur County
Buckingham County
Cornwall County
Cumberland County
Devon County
Dorset County
Franklin County
Glamorgan County
Kent County
Lincoln County
Monmouth County
Montagu County
Montgomery County
Pembroke County
Russell County
Somerset County
Wellington County
Westmoreland County

See also 
 Lands administrative divisions of Tasmania

 
Tasmania
Tasmania